Small RNAs (sRNAs) have been identified within the C. elegans genome and comparative genomics has shown that they are conserved across several nematode species. These sRNAs contain a characteristic 2,2,7-trimethylguanosine (TMG) cap structure that identifies them as non-coding RNAs that have a functional role within the cell but at present the exact function of these sRNAs is unknown. Immunoprecipitation using antibodies against TMG and RNA microarrays were used to identify these sRNA.

Examples
 sbRNA
 SmY RNA

See also
Bacillus subtilis sRNA
Escherichia coli sRNA
Mycobacterium tuberculosis sRNA

References

Caenorhabditis elegans genetics
RNA
Non-coding RNA
Nematode nucleic acids